Robert McCallister may refer to two fictional politicians:

Robert McCallister (Brothers & Sisters)
Robert McCallister (Jack & Bobby)

See also
Robert McAllister (disambiguation)